Callander Football Club was a short-lived 19th-century football club from Glasgow.

History

The club was formed in 1872, out of members of the defunct original Thistle F.C..   In its first half-season, the club claimed to have played three matches, all of which were 0-0 draws.  One of those draws, at Fleshers' Haughs on Glasgow Green, was the first match for Rangers F.C..

The club was one of the original 16 teams to participate in the inaugural season of the Scottish Cup.  The club lost in the first round of the 1873–74 Scottish Cup, 2–0 to Alexandra Athletic; the Glasgow Herald stated that the Callander side "manoeuvred at times very badly".  The club had replaced many of the players from its first few games, and changed its line-up from 2-1-7 to 2-2-6, so the players may not have been as familiar with each other and their roles as the Athletes were.  The club seems to have wound up at the end of the season.

Colours

The club colours were blue caps, white jerseys, and blue knickerbockers.

References

External links
RSSSF: Scottish Cup

Defunct football clubs in Scotland
Association football clubs established in 1872
Association football clubs disestablished in 1874
1872 establishments in Scotland
1874 disestablishments in Scotland